Kharak railway station is a station on the Bhiwani–Rohtak line. It is located in the Indian state of Haryana. It serves Kharak and surrounding area.

See also
 List of railway stations in Haryana

References

Railway stations in Rohtak district